The Jordan Super Cup is a Jordanian football championship contested by the winners of Jordan Premier League and the Jordan FA Cup. In the event that a team wins both League and the Cup, the runners up of the Cup play against the winner of League, from the 2020 season the runners up of the league  play against the winner of League and the cup.

Winners by year

Winners

Total

Performance by representative

References

External links
Jordan - List of Cup Winners, RSSSF.com

 
Super
National association football supercups
1981 establishments in Jordan